Savage Land is a Canadian-American co-produced Western film, directed by Dean Hamilton and released in 1994. Set in the early 1900s, the film stars Corey Carrier and Mercedes McNab as Luke and Hanna Morgan, a brother and sister who are moving to Colorado to reunite with their father after spending some time living with their aunt and uncle in Kansas, only for their stagecoach to be held up by outlaws Quint (Corbin Bernsen) and Cyrus (Brion James).

The cast also includes Vivian Schilling, Charlotte Ross and Graham Greene.

The film was shot near Millarville, Alberta, in 1993.

The song "Far Away", written by Michael Conway Baker and Penny Anne Baker, received a Genie Award nomination for Best Original Song at the 15th Genie Awards.

Reception
The picture was snubbed by critics and even cast members.

Marc Horton, of the Edmonton Journal, called it "one of the worst films ever made".

When asked about this movie 2 years after its release, Charles Napier said his favorite moment was when he and the other performers finally got paid for their work after several delays. (The producers had experienced trouble processing the actors' salaries.) Sonny Landham, meanwhile, was questioned about the possibility of a sequel. His response: "I don't give a f***."

References

External links

1994 films
American Western (genre) films
English-language Canadian films
Canadian Western (genre) films
Films shot in Alberta
1990s English-language films
1990s American films
1990s Canadian films